The Order of the Gold Lion of the House of Nassau is a chivalric order shared by the two branches of the House of Nassau (the Ottonian and Walramian lines).

In the context of the elder Walramian line, this order is the highest Luxembourgian national order and is bestowed by the Grand Duke of Luxembourg. It may be awarded to sovereigns, princes of sovereign houses and heads of state for meritorious service to Luxembourg and the Grand Duke.

In the context of the younger Ottonian line, this order is a house order (dynastic order) of the Dutch Royal House of Orange-Nassau and is awarded as a personal gift by the King of the Netherlands. In this case, the honour is conferred on a person who has rendered special service to the Royal House.

History

1858–1892

The order was founded with royal grand-ducal decree on 31 March 1858 by King-Grand Duke William III.  The sovereignty of the order was to be shared between both branches of the House of Nassau, by virtue of an agreement between William III, King of the Netherlands and Grand Duke of Luxembourg, and Adolphe, Duke of Nassau and future Grand Duke of Luxembourg.  The order originally included only one grade (i.e. Knight), but was increased to four by William III in 1873:
 Grand Cross
 Grand Officer
 Officer
 Knight
The further rank of Commander (in between Grand Officer and Officer) was introduced in 1882.

None of the changes made by William III were confirmed by Adolphe, with whom the order was supposed to be shared, and Adolphe refused to award any of the new grades.  When William III died without a male heir, the grand duchy of Luxembourg passed to Adolphe, as dictated by the Nassau Family Pact.

1892–present
Two years later, in 1892, Adolphe abolished the grades that William III had created unilaterally and, to this day, the order has maintained just one grade, i.e. that of Knight.  In 1905, Adolphe agreed with Queen Wilhelmina of the Netherlands to once again share sovereignty of the order between both ruling branches of the House of Nassau.

At the present time, King Willem-Alexander of the Netherlands and Grand Duke Henri of Luxembourg are joint Grand Masters of the Order of the Gold Lion of Nassau.

The order is conferred only on rare occasions in the Netherlands or Luxembourg. For example, the former Dutch Foreign Secretaries Max van der Stoel and Pieter Kooijmans were made knights of this order by the Queen of the Netherlands. In 1999, the two Grand Masters made the South African President Nelson Mandela a knight during his state visit to the Netherlands (see Nelson Mandela awards).

Insignia
A knight wears the order's badge on a sash on the right shoulder, and the plaque (breast star) of the order on the left chest.

The badge of the order is a white-enamelled golden Maltese Cross, with the golden monogram "N" between the arms of the cross. The obverse central disc is in blue enamel, bearing the Gold Lion of the House of Nassau. The reverse central disc is also blue enamelled, with the motto Je maintiendrai ("I will maintain") in gold.
The plaque is an 8-pointed star with straight silver rays; the same obverse of the badge of the order appears at its centre, surrounded by the motto Je maintiendrai in gold letters on white enamel.
The ribbon of the sash of the order is yellow-orange moiré with a small blue stripe at each edge.

Award criteria 

"Honorary distinctions of the Grand Duchy of Luxembourg":

The Order of the Gold Lion of the House of Nassau can be conferred on sovereigns and on princes of sovereign houses and, nowadays, also on heads of state, for meritorious service to the Grand Duke and country. The bestowal of the insignia is carried out by the Grand Duke or his specially appointed official representative. The brevet is awarded in agreement with the head of the Ottonian branch of the House of Nassau (The Netherlands).

Princes and Princesses of the House of Nassau 

Princes who are sons or brothers of the heads of the two lines of the House of Nassau are born knights of the order. In 1984, Queen Beatrix and Grand Duke Jean made an agreement that princesses (daughters of the heads of the two lines of the House of Nassau) may be admitted when they reach the age of majority (18).

On 16 February 2009, Princess Alexandra of Luxembourg received the order on her 18th birthday. Now that King Willem-Alexander of the Netherlands is the head of the Dutch branch, his daughters Princess Alexia of the Netherlands and Princess Ariane of the Netherlands are also entitled to receive the order on their 18th birthday. His eldest daughter, Catharina-Amalia, Princess of Orange received the order upon her 18th birthday on 17 December 2021.

Recipients 
Grand Masters
 Henri, Grand Duke of Luxembourg (Current)
 Willem-Alexander of the Netherlands (Current)
 William III of the Netherlands (Founder)

Grand Crosses

 Charles Augustus, Hereditary Grand Duke of Saxe-Weimar-Eisenach (1844–1894)
 Frederick Francis II, Grand Duke of Mecklenburg-Schwerin
 Walthère Frère-Orban

Knights

 Akihito
 Albert I of Belgium
 Albert II of Belgium
 Albert of Saxony
 Archduke Albrecht, Duke of Teschen
 Alexander II of Russia
 Alexander of Battenberg
 Prince Alexander of Hesse and by Rhine
 Princess Alexandra of Luxembourg
 Alfred, Duke of Saxe-Coburg and Gotha
 Prince Arnulf of Bavaria
 Prince August, Duke of Dalarna
 Prince August of Württemberg
 Baudouin of Belgium
 Prince Bernhard of Lippe-Biesterfeld
 Prince Bernhard of Saxe-Weimar-Eisenach (1792–1862)
 Bhumibol Adulyadej
 Birendra of Nepal
 Carl XVI Gustaf
 Prince Carl, Duke of Västergötland
 Carol I of Romania
 Aníbal Cavaco Silva
 Charles XV
 Prince Charles, Count of Flanders
 Prince Charles of Luxembourg (born 2020)
 Charlotte, Grand Duchess of Luxembourg
 Christian IX of Denmark
 Prince Constantijn of the Netherlands
 Constantine II of Greece
 Princess Désirée, Baroness Silfverschiöld
 Edward VII
 Elisabeth of Bavaria, Queen of Belgium
 Elizabeth II of Great Britain
 Prince Ernest Augustus, 3rd Duke of Cumberland and Teviotdale
 Ernst I, Duke of Saxe-Altenburg
 Prince Eugen, Duke of Närke
 Prince Felix of Bourbon-Parma
 Prince Félix of Luxembourg
 Heinz Fischer
 Franz Joseph I of Austria
 Frederick VIII of Denmark
 Frederick I, Duke of Anhalt
 Frederick I, Grand Duke of Baden
 Frederick III, German Emperor
 Prince Frederick of Württemberg
 Frederick William IV of Prussia
 Frederick William, Grand Duke of Mecklenburg-Strelitz
 Archduke Friedrich, Duke of Teschen
 Prince Friso of Orange-Nassau
 Prince George, Duke of Cambridge
 George, King of Saxony
 George Victor, Prince of Waldeck and Pyrmont
 Guillaume, Hereditary Grand Duke of Luxembourg
 Prince Guillaume of Luxembourg
 Abdullah Gül
 Haile Selassie
 Tarja Halonen
 Harald V of Norway
 Henrik, Prince Consort of Denmark
 Duke Henry of Mecklenburg-Schwerin
 Prince Hermann of Saxe-Weimar-Eisenach (1825–1901)
 Prince Jean of Luxembourg
 Jean, Grand Duke of Luxembourg
 Prince Johann of Schleswig-Holstein-Sonderburg-Glücksburg
 John of Saxony
 Archduke Joseph Karl of Austria
 Princess Joséphine Charlotte of Belgium
 Juliana of the Netherlands
 Archduke Karl Ferdinand of Austria
 Archduke Karl Ludwig of Austria
 Konstantin of Hohenlohe-Schillingsfürst
 Pieter Kooijmans
 Leopold III of Belgium
 Leopold IV, Duke of Anhalt
 Leopold III, Prince of Lippe
 Prince Leopold of Bavaria
 Walter von Loë
 Émile Loubet
 Louis III, Grand Duke of Hesse
 Louis IV, Grand Duke of Hesse
 Prince Louis of Luxembourg
 Archduke Ludwig Viktor of Austria
 Margrethe II of Denmark
 Maria Teresa, Grand Duchess of Luxembourg
 Infanta Marie Anne of Portugal
 Queen Máxima of the Netherlands
 Grand Duke Michael Nikolaevich of Russia
 Empress Michiko
 Napoleon III
 Prince Nikolaus Wilhelm of Nassau
 Olav V of Norway
 Oscar I of Sweden
 Oscar II
 Otto von Habsburg
 Queen Paola of Belgium
 Duke Peter of Oldenburg
 Prince Philip, Duke of Edinburgh
 Philippe of Belgium
 Prince Philippe, Count of Flanders
 Prince Frederick William of Hesse-Kassel
 Archduke Rainer Ferdinand of Austria
 Rainier III, Prince of Monaco
 Marcelo Rebelo de Sousa
 Jan Jacob Rochussen
 Rudolf, Crown Prince of Austria
 Rupprecht, Crown Prince of Bavaria
 Prince William of Schaumburg-Lippe
 Walter Scheel
 Prince Sébastien of Luxembourg
 Queen Silvia of Sweden
 Queen Sofía of Spain
 Queen Sonja of Norway
 Catharina-Amalia, Princess of Orange
 Konstantinos Stephanopoulos
 Archduke Stephen of Austria (Palatine of Hungary)
 Max van der Stoel
 Princess Tenagnework
 Josip Broz Tito
 Prince Valdemar of Denmark
 Karl von Wedel
 Wilhelmina of the Netherlands
 William I, German Emperor
 William II of Württemberg
 William IV, Grand Duke of Luxembourg
 Prince William of Baden (1829–1897)
 William, Duke of Brunswick
 William, Prince of Wied
 Zog I of Albania

References
 Legislative texts (French and German): 
 Constitution, Art. 41. "The Grand-Duke awards the civil and military orders, while observing about this what the law provides."
 Constitution, Art. 45. "The dispositions taken by the Grand-Duc must be counter-signed by a responsible member of the Government."
 Mémorial A n° 48 of 27.11.1857, Ordonnance royale grand-ducale du 25 novembre 1857 concernant les ordres civils et militaires (General provision about orders in Luxembourg)
 Mémorial A n° 13 of 05.05.1858, Arrêté royal grand-ducal du 31 mars 1858 concernant l'institution d'un Ordre commun aux deux branches de la Maison de Nassau, sous le nom de: «Ordre du Lion d'or de la Maison de Nassau» (Foundation of the Order)
 Mémorial A n° 10 of 28.03.1873, Arrêté royal grand-ducal du 13 mars 1873 concernant l'ordre du Lion d'or de la Maison de Nassau (Creation of new classes in 1873)
 Mémorial A n° 24 du 07.04.1882, Arrêté royal grand-ducal du 29 mars 1882 portant modification des statuts de l'Ordre du Lion d'or de la Maison de Nassau (Modification of statutes )
 Mémorial A n° 10 of 05.03.1892, Arrêté grand-ducal du 22 février 1892 modifiant les statuts de l'ordre du Lion d'or de la Maison de Nassau (Statutes)
 Mémorial A n° 48 of 07.09.1905 Arrêté grand-ducal du 27 août 1905 concernant l'Ordre du Lion d'Or de la Maison de Nassau

External links

 
 

1858 establishments in the Netherlands
 
Awards established in 1858
Orders, decorations, and medals of the German Empire
Orders of chivalry of Luxembourg